John Donald Medinger (born April 26, 1948) is an American politician, teacher, and businessman.

Background
Born in La Crosse, Wisconsin, Medinger graduated from Aquinas High School. Medinger received his bachelor's and master's degree from University of Wisconsin–La Crosse. He was a teacher, gas station operator, and a volunteer in VISTA.

Political life
Medinger was elected to the Wisconsin State Assembly in 1976, as a Democrat, representing the 95th district and served in that post for 16 years. He eventually became Assistant Majority Leader of the Assembly.

After he left the Assembly in 1992, he worked for United States Senator Russ Feingold until 1996. In the spring of 1997, after the retirement of longtime La Crosse Mayor Patrick Zielke, Medinger ran for mayor. He won the election over political newcomer Dan Herber.
In 2001, he won reelection in a landslide over alderman Gerald Every. In 2005, he retired from the Mayor's Office.

After leaving the mayor's Office, Medinger worked in U.S. Senator Herb Kohl's La Crosse office. In December 2012 Medinger announced he would run again for La Crosse mayor in the spring of 2013, but dropped out of the race a few days later.

Post-politics
Medinger worked at the University of Wisconsin–La Crosse as an associate lecturer of political science.

Medinger then served as a member of the La Crosse County Board from 2006 until the spring of 2012. He also served as United States Senator Herb Kohl's La Crosse area representative. Then he was hired to be United States Senator Tammy Baldwin's La Crosse's area representative. Medinger retired from that position on February 20, 2017.

Notes

1948 births
Living people
Democratic Party members of the Wisconsin State Assembly
Mayors of La Crosse, Wisconsin
County supervisors in Wisconsin
Aquinas High School (La Crosse, Wisconsin) alumni
University of Wisconsin–La Crosse faculty
University of Wisconsin–La Crosse alumni